Barnet London Borough Council is the local authority for the London Borough of Barnet in Greater London, England. It is a London borough council, one of 32 within London. Barnet is divided into 21 wards, each electing three councillors.

The council was created by the London Government Act 1963 and replaced five local authorities: Barnet Urban District Council, East Barnet Urban District Council, Friern Barnet Urban District Council, Finchley Borough Council and Hendon Borough Council. The most recent elections to the authority were in May 2022.

History

There have previously been a number of local authorities responsible for the Barnet area. The current local authority was first elected in 1964, a year before formally coming into its powers and prior to the creation of the London Borough of Barnet on 1 April 1965. Barnet replaced Barnet Urban District Council, East Barnet Urban District Council, Friern Barnet Urban District Council, Finchley Borough Council and Hendon Borough Council.

It was envisaged that through the London Government Act 1963, Barnet as a London local authority would share power with the Greater London Council. The split of powers and functions meant that the Greater London Council was responsible for "wide area" services such as fire, ambulance, flood prevention, and refuse disposal; with the local authorities responsible for "personal" services such as social care, libraries, cemeteries and refuse collection. As an outer London borough council it has been an education authority since 1965. This arrangement lasted until 1986, when Barnet London Borough Council gained responsibility for some services that had been provided by the Greater London Council, such as waste disposal. Since 2000 the Greater London Authority has taken some responsibility for highways and planning control from the council, but within the English local government system the council remains a "most purpose" authority in terms of the available range of powers and functions.

In 2012 Barnet outsourced many functions to Capita under the controversial 'One Barnet' programme. Maria Stella Nash, a local resident, challenged the lawfulness of the proposed outsourcing in 2013, on the grounds that the Council had not adequately consulted, had failed to show due regard to its Public Sector Equality Duty, and would be in breach of its fiduciary duty to local council taxpayers. Her application for judicial review was refused. Her application to appeal against that decision was also overruled.

Lord Justice Underhill noted in his ruling that the terms "One Barnet", "One Barnet Framework", "One Barnet Programme" and "One Barnet Programme Framework" were all in use within Council documentation and it was "not clear whether they are wholly interchangeable".

The element of Nash's case which argued that the Council was in breach of its fidicuary duty to its citizens was dealt with only briefly in the judgment because it was considered to be out of time and should have been raised at an earlier stage; however, the judge also took the view that there was insufficient evidence to conclude that been reckless in disregarding the principles of financial planning and management in the development of the programme.

Barnet's outsourcing contracts with Capita were extended in 2022 and will now continue as follows:
HR and accounts payable services until 31 August 2024
IT, customer services and revenue and benefits services until 31 March 2026.
The Council will resume operation of some services not covered by these extensions from September 2023.

Powers and functions
The local authority derives its powers and functions from the London Government Act 1963 and subsequent legislation, and has the powers and functions of a London borough council. It sets council tax and as a billing authority also collects precepts for Greater London Authority functions and business rates. It sets planning policies which complement Greater London Authority and national policies, and decides on almost all planning applications accordingly. It is a local education authority  and is also responsible for council housing, social services, libraries, waste collection and disposal, traffic, and most roads and environmental health.

Services
Electrical items larger than 51 cm x 52 cm may be recycled at the Civic Amenity and Recycling Centre, Summers Lane, North Finchley, London N12 0RF, which collects over 40 different household materials for recycling. It recycles around 68% of the waste received.

Base

The complex at Bristol Avenue in Colindale, completed in 2019, houses many council services, with many other offices elsewhere having moved to this site. The Barnet House on Whetstone High Road continues to provide some council services, as does North London Business Park in New Southgate. Council meetings are held at Hendon Town Hall.

See also
Barnet local elections
North West London Credit Union

References

Local authorities in London
London borough councils
Politics of the London Borough of Barnet
Leader and cabinet executives
Local education authorities in England
Billing authorities in England